The Arnold Palmer is a non-alcoholic beverage that combines iced tea and lemonade. The name refers to the professional American golfer Arnold Palmer, who was known to often request and drink this beverage combination; some attribute the invention of the beverage to the golfer.

The Winnie Palmer drink uses sweet tea with the lemonade, instead of unsweetened ice tea. Winnie is named after Arnold Palmer’s first wife.

An alcoholic version of the beverage (generally made with vodka) is often referred to as a John Daly. However, MillerCoors began marketing and distributing a commercially available malt-based version of the beverage under the Arnold Palmer Spiked name in early 2018.

History
In 2012, an ESPN 30 for 30 Shorts documentary was produced on the drink, featuring Palmer, beverage experts, a group of PGA golfers and comedian Will Arnett discussing the drink's history and popularity. In the film, Palmer attributes the spreading of the drink's name to an incident in which a woman copied his ordering the drink at lunch after a long day of designing a golf course in Palm Springs, California during the late 1960s, saying "I'll have that Arnold Palmer drink, too." Palmer preferred three parts unsweetened tea, to one part lemonade, but when mixed equal parts tea and lemonade, the drink is sometimes called a Half & Half.

According to a waitress at Augusta National Golf Club, Palmer ordered his namesake beverage by saying, "I'll have a Mr. Palmer." When Palmer visited the Latrobe Country Club in his hometown, the staff at the snack shack served the beverage to him or his wife, Kit, without prompting. "Mr. Palmer should never have to order the drink named after him," wrote a former snack shack employee about the club's rules.

The first mention of the beverage nationally was in the Rolling Stone 1997 "Hot Issue."  Screenwriter Scott Alexander said it was the new "hot drink" and called it the "Half-and-Half."  Alexander wrote, "It’s half-iced tea and half-lemonade.  At any Hollywood lunch, everyone orders it."

Mass-produced versions 
The drink has been sold under the Arnold Palmer trademark via a licensing arrangement with Innovative Flavors since 2001. Arizona Beverage Company began marketing and selling the beverage with Palmer's picture and signature on the bottle in 2002 and has handled distribution ever since. The line has expanded to include various flavors including Green Tea, Southern Style Sweet Tea and Pink Lemonade, Zero Calorie, Strawberry, Peach, Mango and Natural Energy. Lemonade combined with iced tea is also sold without the Arnold Palmer trademark by other companies, such as Nestea, Lipton Brisk, Honest Tea (as Half and Half), Nantucket Nectars (as Half and Half), Country Time, Sweet Leaf, XINGtea, Snapple, and Peace Iced Tea (as Caddyshack). It has 43 mg of caffeine per 23 oz drink. Recently, as of April 26, 2021, Chick-fil-A began selling its own version marketed as "Sunjoy."

See also
 List of lemon dishes and drinks
 List of lemonade topics
 Queen Mary (beer cocktail)
Roy Rogers
 Shirley Temple
 Cuisine of Baltimore

References 

Arnold Palmer
Lemonade
Non-alcoholic mixed drinks
Blended tea